Grant Stanley Featherston (17 October 1922 – 9 October 1995) was an Australian furniture designer whose chair designs in the 1950s became icons of the Atomic Age.

He was born in Geelong, Victoria. In 1965 he married Mary Bronwyn Currey, an English-born interior designer, and the couple worked in close partnership as interior designers over several decades.

He is most famous for his furniture designs, especially The 'Contour Chair R160’ chair. He marketed his modernist chairs through art galleries including Peter Bray Gallery in Melbourne and they are now highly collectable on a par with fine art and in 2013 began to attain high prices at auction. He is considered Australia's best known furniture designer.

His work has been featured in several museum retrospectives of post-war furniture, including the National Gallery of Victoria 2013 exhibition, Mid-Century Modern Australian Furniture Design.

Works

Furniture designs

R152 Chair  (1951) Grant Featherston
Wing Chair (1951) Grant Featherston
R160 Lounge chair (1951) Grant Featherston
R161 & R161H (1952) sofa, Grant Featherston
Z300 Chaise longue (1953)  Z300 Grant Featherston (Made under licence by Gordon Mather Industries since 1989)
Talking chairs (1967) Grant and Mary Featherston

Further reading

Whitehouse, Denise. "Design for Life: Grant and Mary Featherston", 2018, Heide Museum of Modern Art,.
Isaac, Geoff. "Featherston" Hardback, September 2017, Thames & Hudson
Lane, Terence. "Featherston chairs: [exhibition] National Gallery of Victoria, 30 March-7 August 1988" Paperback – 1988

References

Modernist designers
Australian designers
Furniture designers
1922 births
1995 deaths
People from Geelong